Church of St. Casimir is a historicist style church in Naujoji Vilnia elderate of Vilnius, Lithuania. Current shape church was erected in 1911. Naujoji Vilnia church is one of the tallest churches in Vilnius.

External links

Roman Catholic churches in Vilnius
Naujoji Vilnia